Goharbaran-e Jonubi Rural District is a rural district (dehestan) in Gahrbaran District, Miandorud County, Mazandaran Province, Iran. At the 2006 census, its population was 7,999, in 2,157 families. The rural district has 8 villages.

References 

Rural Districts of Mazandaran Province
Miandorud County